Wishing well is a type of well in European folklore.

Wishing Well may also refer to:

Music
 Wishing Well (album), a 2001 album by Monte Montgomery
 The Wishing Well (band), a folk rock band from Melbourne, Australia

Songs
 "Wishing Well" (Free song), 1972, covered by many other bands and artists
 "Wishing Well" (Terence Trent D'Arby song), 1987
 "Wishing Well" (Phantom Planet song), 2004
 "Wishing Well" (Juice Wrld song), 2020
 "Wishing Well", a song by The Airborne Toxic Event from their self-titled debut album (2008) 
 "Wishing Well", a song by Anastacia from Not That Kind (2000)
 "Wishing Well", a song by Angra from Temple of Shadows (2004)
 "Wishing Well", a song by Ben Moody from All for This (2009)
 "Wishing Well", a song by Black Sabbath from Heaven and Hell (1980)
 "Wishing Well", a song by Blind Melon from For My Friends (2008)
 "Wishing Well", a song by Blink-182 from Neighborhoods (2011)
 "Wishing Well", a song by Bob Mould from Workbook (1989)
 "Wishing Well", a song by Dani Stevenson (2010)
 "Wishing Well", a song by Converge from Axe to Fall (2009)
 "Wishing Well", a song by Morphine from Like Swimming (1997)
 "Wishing Well", a song by Chromatics from Closer to Grey (2019)
 "Wishing Wells", a song by Parkway Drive from Reverence (2018)
 "The Wishing Well" (song), a 1987 charity single
 "Wishing Well", a song by Buckethead from Colma (1998)
 "The Wishing Well", a song by Phinehas from Thegodmachine (2011)

Other uses
 Wishing Well (play), 1946 play by 	Eynon Evans
 Wishing Well (novel), a 2007 book based on the TV series Doctor Who
 Wishing well (wedding), a donation box found at weddings
 Wishing Well (horse), American Thoroughbred racing mare
 Wishing Well: Water for the World, a public charity based in Oklahoma City, Oklahoma
 Wishing Well Cluster, another name for the star cluster NGC 3532
 The Wishing Well (film), 2009 Hallmark original movie
 Wishing Well, a speaking recording by Raffi on his 1995 album: "Raffi Radio"